Pocosol River is a river in northern Costa Rica.

References

Rivers of Costa Rica